Peter Camani is a Canadian artist and sculptor who currently resides near Burk's Falls, Ontario. His property, the Midlothian Castle, is notable for being an expansive sculpture garden, featuring countless statues, structures, assemblage artworks and Camani's castle-like house. The location is commonly known as Screaming Heads.

Biography 
Peter Camani grew up in Hamilton, Ontario, and took interest in art at an early age. He attended the University of Waterloo in Sciences, but in his third year transferred from sciences to the arts. After graduating with a B.A., he went to Western University, later becoming an art teacher at Almaguin Highlands Secondary School in South River, Ontario.
Camani began working on his property-wide art project around 1981. Retiring from teaching in 2008, he has continued his creative endeavours, the collection of art on his property ever expanding.

Screaming Heads 

Peter Camani's Midlothian Castle, commonly known as Screaming Heads, is a public art installation featuring numerous sculptures, artworks and structures. The monolithic, 20 foot high concrete sculptures range from Munch-like screaming faces to hands, horses, and memorials.

Camani's home is a farm house converted into a castle, topped with a turret resembling a screaming face and a two-headed dragon sitting atop the chimney. Facing the road is a wall topped with busts of people reenacting the "see no evil, hear no evil, speak no evil" proverb, while facing the parking lot is a towering metal gate that resembles a spider web.

Camani is responsible for planting many of the trees on his property, which was once barren farmland, as well as propagating spring-fed ponds. The large concrete structures are arranged in such a way that they form the shape of a dragon when viewed from the air, although trees now obscure some of the statues. Camani has explained that his sculptures stand as a warning against environmental degradation, resembling "the earth rebelling against what we’re doing to the land."

Of the public's perception of his work, Camani has commented via his website;

A small screaming head statue can also be found outside the Burk's Falls Welcome Centre.

Harvest Festival 

Camani's grounds are the location of an annual Harvest Festival, a weekend-long event that takes place in mid September showcasing electronic dance musicians, DJs, and other activities.

The large, steel-frame structures on Camani's property were erected by festival organizers to serve as performance and eating venues. While these structures are left bare for most of the year, when covered with fabric they come to resemble a crashed spaceship, pyramids and domes.

Media appearances 

Camani's castle has been featured several times on Canadian television, including the CBC series On The Road Again, Arthur Black's Weird Homes and more. Peter Camani was also the subject of the 1996 documentary Concrete Ambitions, a film which won two awards.

In 2011, Peter's house was featured in the first episode of MTV's Extreme Cribs.

Film 

In 2005, Peter Camani, in collaboration with director Dallas Boyes, began production on a fantasy film entitled Witch Way. The film was shot in Screaming Heads and the surrounding Burk's Falls area. Camani employed the help of students from Almaguin Highlands Secondary School, along with local musicians Paul Shillolo and Jeff Stamp. An Almaguin News article suggests editing for the film was completed sometime in 2008, with a trailer being shared via Camani's old website. However, for unknown reasons, it appears the film never saw a public release.

Gallery

References

External links
 Artists's website

Canadian sculptors
Canadian male sculptors
Living people
Year of birth missing (living people)
Artists from Ontario
Visionary environments